Trial division is the most laborious but easiest to understand of the integer factorization algorithms.  The essential idea behind trial division tests to see if an integer n, the integer to be factored, can be divided by each number in turn that is less than n.  For example, for the integer , the only numbers that divide it are 1, 2, 3, 4, 6, 12.  Selecting only the largest powers of primes in this list gives that .

Trial division was first described by Fibonacci in his book Liber Abaci (1202).

Method 
Given an integer n (n refers to "the integer to be factored"), the trial division consists of systematically testing whether n is divisible by any smaller number. Clearly, it is only worthwhile to test candidate factors less than n, and in order from two upwards because an arbitrary n is more likely to be divisible by two than by three, and so on. With this ordering, there is no point in testing for divisibility by four if the number has already been determined not divisible by two, and so on for three and any multiple of three, etc.  Therefore, the effort can be reduced by selecting only prime numbers as candidate factors. Furthermore, the trial factors need go no further than  because, if n is divisible by some number p, then n = p × q and if q were smaller than p, n would have been detected earlier as being divisible by q or by a prime factor of q.

A definite bound on the prime factors is possible. Suppose  is the 'th prime, so that P1 = 2, P2 = 3, P3 = 5, etc. Then the last prime number worth testing as a possible factor of n is  where ; equality here would mean that  is a factor. Thus, testing with 2, 3, and 5 suffices up to n = 48 not just 25 because the square of the next prime is 49, and below n = 25 just 2 and 3 are sufficient. Should the square root of n be an integer, then it is a factor and n is a perfect square.

An example of the trial division algorithm, using successive integers as trial factors, is as follows (in Python):
def trial_division(n: int) -> list[int]:
    """Return a list of the prime factors for a natural number."""
    a = []               # Prepare an empty list.
    f = 2                # The first possible factor.    
    while n > 1:         # While n still has remaining factors...
        if n % f == 0:   # The remainder of n divided by f might be zero.        
            a.append(f)  # If so, it divides n. Add f to the list.
            n //= f      # Divide that factor out of n.
        else:            # But if f is not a factor of n,
            f += 1       # Add one to f and try again.
    return a             # Prime factors may be repeated: 12 factors to 2,2,3.                          
Or 2x more efficient:
def trial_division(n: int) -> list[int]:
    a = []
    while n % 2 == 0:
        a.append(2)
        n //= 2
    f = 3
    while f * f <= n:
        if n % f == 0:
            a.append(f)
            n //= f
        else:
            f += 2
    if n != 1: a.append(n)
    # Only odd number is possible
    return a
 
These versions of trial division are guaranteed to find a factor of n if there is one since they check all possible factors of n  and if n is a prime number, this means trial factors all the way up to n. Thus, if the algorithm finds one factor only, n, it is proof that n is a prime. If more than one factor is found, then n is a composite integer. A more computationally advantageous way of saying this is, if any prime whose square does not exceed n divides it without a remainder, then n is not prime.

Below is a version in C++ (without squaring f)
template <class T, class U>
vector<T> TrialDivision(U n)
{
    vector<T> v; T f;
    f = 2;
    while (n % 2 == 0) { v.push_back(f); n /= 2; }
    f = 3;
    while (n % 3 == 0) { v.push_back(f); n /= 3; }
    f = 5;
    T ac = 9, temp = 16;
    do {
        ac += temp; // Assume addition does not cause overflow with U type
        if (ac > n) break; 
        if (n % f == 0) {
            v.push_back(f);
            n /= f;
            ac -= temp;
        }
        else { 
            f += 2;
            temp += 8;
        }
    } while (1);
    if (n != 1) v.push_back(n);
    return v;
}

Speed
In the worst case, trial division is a laborious algorithm. For a base-2 n digit number a, if it starts from two and works up only to the square root of a, the algorithm requires

trial divisions, where  denotes the prime-counting function, the number of primes less than x. This does not take into account the overhead of primality testing to obtain the prime numbers as candidate factors. A useful table need not be large: P(3512) = 32749, the last prime that fits into a sixteen-bit signed integer and P(6542) = 65521 for unsigned sixteen-bit integers. That would suffice to test primality for numbers up to 655372 = 4,295,098,369. Preparing such a table (usually via the Sieve of Eratosthenes) would only be worthwhile if many numbers were to be tested. If instead a variant is used without primality testing, but simply dividing by every odd number less than the square root the base-2 n digit number a, prime or not, it can take up to about:

In both cases, the required time grows exponentially with the digits of the number.

Even so, this is a quite satisfactory method, considering that even the best-known algorithms have exponential time growth. For a chosen uniformly at random from integers of a given length, there is a 50% chance that 2 is a factor of a and a 33% chance that 3 is a factor of a, and so on. It can be shown that 88% of all positive integers have a factor under 100 and that 92% have a factor under 1000.

However, many-digit numbers that do not have factors in the small primes can require days or months to factor with the trial division. In such cases other methods are used such as the quadratic sieve and the general number field sieve (GNFS). Because these methods also have superpolynomial time growth a practical limit of n digits is reached very quickly. For this reason, in public key cryptography, values for a are chosen to have large prime factors of similar size so that they cannot be factored by any publicly known method in a useful time period on any available computer system or computer cluster such as supercomputers and computer grids. The largest cryptography-grade number that has been factored is RSA-250, a 250 digits number, using the GNFS and resources of several supercomputers. The running time was 2700 core years.

References

External links 
 Wikiversity offers a lesson on prime factorization using trial division with Python.
 Fast JavaScript Prime Factor Calculator using trial division. Can handle numbers up to about 253
 Trial Division in Java, C and JavaScript 

Integer factorization algorithms
Division (mathematics)
Articles with example Python (programming language) code